Working Girls is a 2010 Filipino comedy film remake directed by Jose Javier Reyes and starring Eugene Domingo, Jennylyn Mercado, Iza Calzado, Cristine Reyes, Bianca King, Eula Valdez and Ruffa Gutierrez. With a screenplay by Amado Lacuesta, it was produced by GMA Pictures, Viva Films, and Unitel Pictures and released to cinemas on April 21, 2010, in the Philippines.

Plot
They are everyday women who all live in a world where men rule business and women rule the office. In this comedy hit of the summer, the story begins with Paula, (Eugene Domingo) the daughter-in-law of Nimfa (Gina Pareño). She is the queen of fake designer bags. She gets high earnings from her living and uses them to put her children through private school, something that her irresponsible and unemployed husband cannot provide. Then there is a single mom, Ada (Jennylyn Mercado), a young woman who is a call center agent by night and a student by day, working hard to provide for her young son. In the process, she neglects her son and puts additional strain on her relationship with her mother, Sabel (Rio Locsin). Ada is also close friends with Tobz (Carlo Aquino) who is currently having issues with his girlfriend, Wendy (Cristine Reyes) also a busy woman who does not give him time nor pleasure and whose long life goal is to become an actress. While pursuing this, she meets Rodney (Rafael Rosell), who is also an attorney to celebrity plastic surgeon, Dr. Cleo Carillo. One of her clients/friends, Marilou (Ruffa Gutierrez), a beauty queen turned CEO upon the death of her husband, is also having problems with Amanda Dela Vega, her husband's daughter from another woman, and her own daughter, Dara Dela Vega (Bianca King). Dara is a Berkeley graduate who is eager to prove herself at her new job in a television show; she is struggling to manager her issues from home and her issues from her boss, Suzanne (Carmi Martin), Marilou's best friend. Another story follows Theresa (Iza Calzado), a nurse for Dr. Carillo's husband and who is content with her work but struggles to deal with her broken heart.

In the end, Paula, after a brief love affair with her temporary driver (Ricky Davao) decides to continue being a loud-mouthed and responsible wife. Ada finally decides to love Tabz while Wendy is left brokenhearted when Rodney leaves. Dara shows her wits and talent as she uncovers the truth about a protestor Dolorosa "Rose" Bonefacio (Maria Isabel Lopez), a women's rights activist. Marilou also finds some information on Amanda's schemes against the company. Lastly, there is Theresa, who finally forgives her ex-suitor and Emily.

This story reflects the challenges of everyday woman, involving family, love, money and the community. The story is based on the hit Viva Films Comedy 26 years ago and is the sequel to Ishmael Bernal's Blockbuster top grosser in the 80's.

Cast

Main cast
 Eugene Domingo as Paula Cajanding
 Ruffa Gutierrez as Marilou Cobarrubias
 Iza Calzado as Theresa "Tere" Villanueva
 Jennylyn Mercado as Ada Rosales
 Cristine Reyes  as Wendy Casuga
 Bianca King as Dara Dela Vega
 Eula Valdez as Dra. Cleo Carillo

Supporting cast
 Gina Pareño as Nimfa Cajanding
 Maria Isabel Lopez as Dolorosa "Rose" Bonifacio
 Mylene Dizon as Connie Valderamma
 Carmi Martin as Suzanne Galang Cavendish
 Rio Locsin as Sabel Rosales
 Jef Gaitan as Sara
 Katya Santos as Amy
 Ricky Davao as Nelson Obleta
 Rafael Rosell as Atty. Rodney Camacho
 Jao Mapa as Leon Arnaldo
 Carlo Aquino as Tobs
 Kirby De Jesus as Jaime Dela Vega
 Antonio Aquitania as Bobby Cajanding
 Andrea del Rosario as Rachel
 Joey Paras 
 Matthew Mendoza 
 Ina Feleo as Raissa Arnaldo 
 Empress Schuck as Sylvia 
 Cherie Gil as Amanda Dela Vega
 Manuel Chua as Albert Cetascoso
 Antonette Garcia as Lita
 LJ Moreno as Dra. Maya Fernandez
 Jake Cuenca as Jason

Guest cast
 Liza Lorena as Ynes
 Jackie Lou Blanco as Maura Abesamis
 Dante Rivero as Ronald Casuga

See also
 GMA Films
 VIVA Films
 Philippine films of the 2000s

References

External links
 

2010 films
Philippine romantic comedy films
Philippine comedy-drama films
Films about Filipino women
2010s Tagalog-language films
2010 comedy-drama films
GMA Pictures films
Viva Films films
2010s English-language films